Joan L. Chase (November 26, 1936 Wooster, Ohio – April 17, 2018) was an American novelist.

Biography
Joan Chase moved from town to town in Ohio throughout her childhood. She graduated from the University of Maryland magna cum laude. From 1980 to 1984, she was an assistant director of the  Ragdale Foundation. She was a member of PEN. Her first novel, During the Reign of the Queen of Persia was published in 1983 and won the PEN/Hemingway Prize for First Fiction by an American author. The book was republished in 2014 by New York Review Books with an introduction by Meghan O'Rourke.

Death
Chase died on 17 April 2018 at the age of 81, after a long illness.

Awards
 1983, PEN/Hemingway Prize
 1984, Janet Heidinger Kafka Prize
 1987, Whiting Award
 1990, Guggenheim Fellowship

Works

References

External links

Whiting Foundation Profile

1936 births
2018 deaths
20th-century American novelists
People from Wooster, Ohio
University of Maryland, College Park alumni
Hemingway Foundation/PEN Award winners
American women novelists
20th-century American women writers
21st-century American women